The Mad Racer was a 1926 short comedy silent film directed by Philadelphian director, Benjamin Stoloff. The film starred Earle Foxe and Florence Gilbert.

Cast
Earle Foxe		
Florence Gilbert		
Jean Arthur		
Jere Austin		
Frank Beal		
Frank Cooley		
Lynn Cowan		
Lawford Davis		
Edna Marion		
Patrick Rooney

References

External links

1926 films
American silent short films
Films directed by Benjamin Stoloff
Silent American comedy films
American black-and-white films
1926 short films
American comedy short films
1926 comedy films
1920s American films